Sidekick cell adhesion molecule 1 is a protein that in humans is encoded by the SDK1 gene.

Function

The protein encoded by this gene is a member of the immunoglobulin superfamily. The protein contains six immunoglobulin-like domains and thirteen fibronectin type III domains. Fibronectin type III domains are present in both extracellular and intracellular proteins and tandem repeats are known to contain binding sites for DNA, heparin and the cell surface. Alternative splicing results in multiple transcript variants. [provided by RefSeq, Jul 2016].

References

Further reading